Siman (also Romanized as Sīmān) is a village in Yam Rural District, Meshkan District, Khoshab County, Razavi Khorasan Province, Iran. At the 2006 census, its population was 251, in 68 families.

References 

Populated places in Khoshab County